Vigor "Kuta" Lindberg (26 April 1899 – 28 April 1956) was a Swedish footballer who played as a forward. He made two appearances for the Sweden national team between 1918 and 1929.

References

External links
 

1899 births
1956 deaths
Swedish footballers
Association football forwards
Sweden international footballers
Sportspeople from Norrköping
Footballers from Östergötland County